Periocular injection is an ocular route of drug administration. It is well-established route of treatment for severe uveitis and cystoid macular edema (CME) bu using corticosteroids.

Subconjunctival injection is one of periocular routes of administration.

References

Ophthalmic drug administration